David John Levenick  (born May 28, 1959) is a former American football linebacker. He played college football at Wisconsin. He was drafted in the 12th round (315th overall) by the Atlanta Falcons.

Early years
Levenick attended Grafton High School in Grafton, Wisconsin. For his senior season, he was named to the United Press International (UPI) All-state team. That off season, he appeared in the inaugural Wisconsin High School Shrine game, recording 12 tackles.

As a freshman, at the University of Wisconsin, Leveneck was part of what head coach John Jardine called a "tremendous" recruiting class. In 1978, he appeared in 11 games, and started two in relief of injured starter Dave Crossen. In 1979, he was named a starter, replacing Crossen. In November 1981, the Wisconsin players voted him team MVP for the season. As a senior, he tied Tim Krumrie with 114 total tackles. For the season, Levenick was named Second-team All-Conference.

Professional career
Levenick was selected in the 12th round (315th overall) of the 1982 NFL Draft by the Atlanta Falcons. In early May 1982, he signed his rookie contract.

On August 28, 1984 he was waived by the Falcons. On September 4, 1984, was placed on injured reserve.

References

1959 births
Atlanta Falcons players
People from Grafton, Wisconsin
Players of American football from Milwaukee
Wisconsin Badgers football players
Living people